The 2021 season was St Patrick's Athletic F.C.'s 92nd year in existence and is the Supersaint's 70th consecutive season in the top-flight of Irish football. It was the second full season with Stephen O'Donnell as manager, having taken over from Harry Kenny on 31 August 2019. Pre-season training for the squad began on 1 February 2021, the same day the league fixtures were announced, with the Saints revealed to be playing rivals Shamrock Rovers away in the opening game of the season on 19 March. The 2021 editions of the League of Ireland Cup and the Leinster Senior Cup were cancelled due to the delay in the start to the 2021 League of Ireland Premier Division as a result of the Coronavirus pandemic. The season was a hugely successful one for the club, as they secured a 2nd place finish, securing UEFA Europa Conference League football for 2022, as well as winning the 2021 FAI Cup in front of an Aviva Stadium FAI Cup Final record crowd of 37,126.

Squad

Transfers

Transfers in

Transfers out

Squad statistics

Appearances, goals and cards
Number in brackets represents (appearances of which were substituted ON).
Last updated – 29 November 2021

Top scorers
Includes all competitive matches.
Last updated 29 November 2021

Top assists
Includes all competitive matches.
Last updated 29 November 2021

Top clean sheets
Includes all competitive matches.
Last updated 29 November 2021

Disciplinary record
Last updated 29 November 2021

Captains

Club

Coaching staff
Head coach: Stephen O'Donnell
Assistant manager: Pat Cregg
First-team coach: Alan Mathews
Director of Football: Ger O'Brien
Coach: Seán O'Connor
Opposition Analyst: Martin Doyle
Goalkeeping coach: Pat Jennings
Strength and Conditioning Coach: Chris Colburn
Physiotherapist: Mark Kenneally
Physiotherapist: Lee Van Haeften
Physiotherapist: Christy O'Neill
Club Doctor: Dr Matt Corcoran
Equipment Manager: David McGill
Under 19s Head Coach: Seán O'Connor
Under 19s Coach: Niall Cully
Under 19s Coach: John Donohue
Under 17s Head Coach: Marc Kenny
Under 17s Coach: Paul Webb
Under 17s Coach: Sean Gahan
Under 15s Head Coach: Seán O'Connor
Under 15s Coach: Daniel McGuinness
Under 15s Coach: Billy Smith
Under 13s Head Coach: Mark Connolly
Under 13s Coach: Phil Power
Under 13s Coach: Craig Dempsey

Kit

|
|
|
|
|}

The club released new Home & Away kits for the season.

Key:
LOI=League of Ireland Premier Division
FAI=FAI Cup
FRN=Friendly

Competitions

League of Ireland

League table

Results summary

Results by round

Matches

FAI Cup

Friendlies

Pre-season

References

2021
2021 League of Ireland Premier Division by club